Barbara Daly (born November 13,1939) is an American author of romance novels.  She won the Romance Writers of America's RITA Award in 2002 for Best Short Contemporary Romance for her novel A Long Hot Christmas.  She has also been twice nominated by Romantic Times for Reviewers' Choice Awards, for A Long Hot Christmas and Too Hot to Handle.  Romantic Times described her Harlequin Duets novel Are You For Real as "fast-paced, fresh and funny".

Bibliography

Novels
Three for the Road (1999)
Home Improvement (1999)
A Long Hot Christmas (2001)
Too Hot to Handle (2002)
Mistletoe Over Manhattan (2003)
When the Lights Go Out... (2004)
Kiss and Run (2005)

Omnibus
Great Genes! / Make Me Over (1999) (with Meg Lacy)
The Wrong Mr Right / Never Say Never! (2000) (with Tina Wainscott)
You Call This Romance? / Are You for Real? (2002)
Mistletoe Over Manhattan / A Sure Thing (2003) (with Jacquie D'Alessandro)
When the Lights Go Out / Her Private Dancer (2004) (with Cami Dalton)
To the Max / Kiss and Run (2005) (with Darlene Gardner)
Dare / Kiss and Run (2006) (with Cara Summers)

References

External links 
 

1939 births
Living people
American romantic fiction writers
RITA Award winners
American women novelists
Women romantic fiction writers
20th-century American novelists
20th-century American women writers
21st-century American women